Kashgar-Kyshtak is a village, center of Kashgar-Kyshtak rural community in Kara-Suu District of Osh Region of Kyrgyzstan. Its population was 20,334 in 2021. The ancient settlement Kashgar-Kyshtak is located in proximity to the village.

Population

References

 

Populated places in Osh Region